Danny Thomas (born 13 May 1985 in Cardiff) is a retired Welsh former professional footballer. In his professional and semi-professional career, he played for Cardiff City and Carmarthen Town, Haverfordwest County and Bridgend Town. He has played for Wales at Under 17 and Under 19 level.

Career

Thomas began his career as a trainee with Cardiff City, turning professional in July 2004. After impressing in the reserve side he was handed his league debut on 19 November 2004 when he was brought on as a second-half substitute for Chris Barker in the 1–0 defeat at home to Preston North End. He played in the FAW Premier Cup defeat to Bangor City later in the season but it would be his last appearance for Cardiff and he was released in May 2005.

He joined Carmarthen Town in July 2005 and since become a prolific goalscorer, scoring his 50th league goal for the side on 28 November 2009 during a 3–1 win over Bala Town. In June 2010, Thomas moved to local rivals Haverfordwest County.

A move to Bridgend Town, before a short-lived return to Carmarthen Town in the summer of 2012.  He retired from Welsh Premier League football in October 2012 to join the Cardiff City Academy as coach to their Under-10 players

References

External links

Welsh Premier League profile

Living people
1985 births
Footballers from Cardiff
Welsh footballers
Bridgend Town A.F.C. players
Cardiff City F.C. players
Carmarthen Town A.F.C. players
English Football League players
Cymru Premier players
Haverfordwest County A.F.C. players
Association football midfielders
Cardiff City F.C. non-playing staff